Bulimulus guadalupensis is a species of  tropical air-breathing land snail, a pulmonate gastropod mollusk in the subfamily Bulimulinae.

The specific name guadalupensis refers to the West Indian  island of Guadeloupe.

Distribution 
Bulimulus guadalupensis probably originated in the Windward Islands (Breure, 1974). Now it is distributed throughout the Caribbean Basin, including Florida.

 Dominica - introduced It is a highly variable species, which was recorded by Breure (1974) from one locality only: Roseau, Botanical Gardens. Angas (1884) reports it as “abundant on the lower slopes”. It is widely distributed in disturbed habitats throughout lowland Dominica.
 Guadeloupe - introduced
 Martinique - introduced

References
This article incorporates CC-BY-3.0 text from the reference 

Bulimulus
Gastropods described in 1789